Now Hear This... is the debut album by American rock band The Split Squad.  
Featuring the lineup of Clem Burke, Michael Giblin, Josh Kantor, Eddie Munoz, and Keith Streng, it 
was released on January 21, 2014 on Red Chuck records and features contributions from Scott McCaughey and Peter Buck of R.E.M. and The Baseball Project, Hugo Burnham of Gang of Four and Mike Gent of The Figgs.

Background
According to bandleader and bassist Giblin, the band's "...sound might be best described as a trip through our 
record collections. A little punk, a little soul, a little glam, a lot of attitude!"  About half 
of the songs were written by Giblin.  According to him, some of the songs had been in his notebook at one stage or 
another, ""e.g."", the title song began to take form about 4 years before it was finished for the album.  Not all 
songs took so long, "I Can't Remember" was created "...in about 40 minutes in a hotel room in India".  The first 
collaboratively-written song was "Touch & Go".  On that song, guitarist Streng wrote almost all the music, and 
Giblin wrote the lyrics and melody. Giblin and McCaughey collaborated on "Superman Says", with Giblin having the 
verses and the melody, but no chorus.  He emailed the song to McCaughey, and about 20 minutes later received an 
email with an mp3 containing the lyrics.  The album set of 10 original songs is rounded out with four covers.  
Steng takes over on vocals for a cover of '60's and '70's British musician Terry Reid "Tinker Taylor" - 
misspelled "Tinker Tailor" on the CD and back cover.  The band covers "Put It Down", by Pennsylvania power 
pop/garage rock band The Jellybricks. The third cover is of The Small Faces "Sorry She's Mine".  In the album 
acknowledgements, they list The Small Faces, adding "[especially The Small Faces]"  The final cover is "You'll Never Change" first performed by Bettye LaVette, and covered by others.

Recording
In an interview with Giblin, the band had been performing many of the songs on the album for nearly a year, but it 
took 4 months to coordinate everyone's schedules to book, in May 2013, a week of "summer camp", as producer 
Don Dixon calls it, in David Minehan's Woolly Mammoth Studios in Boston.  A photogallery of 
that week is available on the group's web site. During that week, about 85% of 14 tracks were recorded.  All the 
basic instrument tracks as well as all lead vocals were recorded then.  
During that week's recording session, drummer Hugo Burnham, who lives in the Boston area, was invited by the band to sit in and perform with them.  He played congas on "Messin' Around" while during "I've 
Got A Feeling"'s breakdown, he overdubbed, on a separate drum kit, a second drum part.  The individual kits were 
flanged and panned far left and right, with Burke on the left. Later, Streng's vocal and some lead guitar overdubs 
in "Tinker Tailor" were done in Andy Shernoff's studio in Brooklyn.  At Woolly Mammoth Studios, the signal path was analog, through a Neotech 
Elite console, until digitized with a Pro Tools HD-2 digital audio workstation.  Giblin subsequently went to Portland to Scott McCaughey's Dungeon of Horror studios to 
do most of what remained.

Reception
Reviews of the album have been uniformly positive.  Blurt reviewed the album, giving it 5 out of 5 stars. 
Writing for Carolina Orange, Richard Rossi wrote that with this collaboration"...there is more collective genius in the making of this 
disc than any that’s come along in a very long time." After receiving the album from Closer 
Records, Joe Whyte opened his review with "Powerpop/garage nobility with quite possibly the who-the-hell-are-
they-and why didn’t I know-about-them album re-release of the year!" giving the album a 9 of 10 rating.

Track listing
Now Hear This  – 3:44
Touch & Go – 3:17
She Is Everything – 3:16
Sorry She's Mine – 2:43
I've Got A Feeling – 3:28
I Can't Remember – 3:30
Feel The Same About You – 3:04
Superman Says – 2:25
Put It Down – 2:19
Tinker Tailor – 3:16
Hey Hey Baby – 2:02
You'll Never Change – 4:15
Messin' Around – 4:31

Personnel

Band members
Clem Burke - drums, congas, percussion
Michael Giblin - Vocals, electric bass and 6 and 12-string guitars piano, recording and mixing engineer
Josh Kantor - keyboards
Eddie Munoz - Electric 6 and 12-string guitars
Keith Streng - Vocals, electric 6 and 12-string guitars, 6 string acoustic guitar,

Additional musicians
Peter Buck - 12 string guitar on "Superman Says"
Hugo Burnham - backing vocals, aka "Yob Vox" on Track 1, 2nd drums on Track 5, congas on Track 13
Mike Gent - "Yob Vox" on Track 1, electric 12 string guitar on Track 8
Scott McCaughey - vocals, electric 6 string guitar, keyboards, harmonica, percussion

Additional personnel
Kurt Bloch - recording engineer
Rick West - drum technician
David James Minehan - recording and mix engineer
Adam Seltzer - recording engineer
Andy Shernoff - recording engineer
Scott McCaughey - producer
Roger Seibel - mastering engineer, SAE Digital & Analog Mastering, Phoenix, Arizona

References

External links
Album recording photos at Woolly Mammoth Studios
Closer Records

2014 debut albums